"La grenade" is a song by French singer Clara Luciani released in 2018. Commercially, the song has charted in Belgium where it peaked at number five and reached the top thirty in France.

Charts

Weekly charts

Year-end charts

Certifications

References

2018 singles
2018 songs
French-language songs
French pop songs